Lollipops and Roses may refer to:

"Lollipops and Roses" (song), 1962 popular song composed by Tony Velona, recorded by Jack Jones, and others
Lollipops and Roses (album), debut studio album recorded in 1962 by Paul Peterson